Utricularia blanchetii is a small, probably annual carnivorous plant that belongs to the genus Utricularia. U. blanchetii is endemic to Brazil and is only known from central Bahia state. It was originally described and published by Alphonse Pyrame de Candolle in 1844.

See also 
 List of Utricularia species

References 

Carnivorous plants of South America
Endemic flora of Brazil
Flora of Bahia
blanchetii
Plants described in 1844